The Great Fire of Toronto of 1849, April 7, 1849, also known as the Cathedral Fire, was the first major fire in the history of Toronto, Ontario, Canada. Much of the Market Block, the business core of the city, was wiped out, including the predecessor of the current St. James Cathedral. The 1831 building of the Toronto City Hall and St. Lawrence Market south of King was damaged and was torn down.

Background

Before the fire, Toronto's fire-fighting capabilities were limited to six volunteer companies operating in one fire hall at Court Street and Church Street. Manual pumpers and tankers involved far too much manpower and would prove to be no match for the speed of a major fire. The fire halls existing in Toronto in 1849 were:

 Fireman's Hall on Church Street south of Adelaide Street East (Newgate) - Built 1826 and renumbered as Fire Hall Number 5 in 1861; it was closed in 1874.
 Fire Hall Number 1 at 139-141 Bay Street - Built 1841 and closed by Toronto Fire Department in 1924.
 Engine Number 4 at St. Patrick's Market on Queen Street West - Built 1842 and closed 1861.
 Fire Hose Company Number 2 at Berkeley Street - Built 1849 and closed 1859.

A second Fireman's Hall at Bay Street had been built in 1839, but it had closed in 1841, some eight years before the fire.

Fire

The fire was discovered at 1 a.m. in the rear of Graham's Tavern on the north-east side of King Street and Nelson Street (Jarvis Street) at George, behind Post's Tavern. The fire consumed Post's Tavern then burned through the outbuildings north to Duke Street. The fire spread through the whole block, destroying the Home District Saving Bank and frame buildings to the east on King Street. At this point, a south-easterly wind had come up. The fire was blown across Nelson Street to Rolf's Tavern and consumed all of the buildings of the Market Block south of Duke Street (Adelaide Street) in the block bounded by King Street East, Nelson, Duke and the north-south back lane east of Church streets. At 3 a.m., the spire of the first St. James Cathedral at Church Street caught fire and the cathedral was soon destroyed. The fire spread to the south side of King Street and the 'old' (1831) Toronto City Hall and market building. It damaged most buildings on the east side of Nelson. At its height, the fire was visible from across Lake Ontario in St. Catharines.

The fire could have spread further, but Toronto west of Church Street was saved by a rain shower at about 3:30 a.m. This wet down the roofs of buildings to the west, making it harder for flying brands to ignite them. The wind was from the north-east, pushing the fire away from the court house, fire hall and St. Andrew's Church west of Church Street. At 4 a.m., troops arrived to assist the firefighters, and it was this assistance that likely saved the buildings on the south side of King Street from major damage. According to The Globe, the fire was mostly extinguished by 5 a.m.

The loss to insurance companies was $239,724. One life was lost, Richard Watson, publisher of the Canadian and Upper Canada Gazette journals, was in the office of The Patriot newspaper at Nelson and Front, attempting to save printer types, when the floor collapsed, and he was trapped in the fire. The Upper Canada Gazette, the first newspaper in Ontario, would not resume publication.

While the buildings on the main streets were brick, the inner buildings along laneways were made of wood and likely fuelled the fire. The early firefighting companies of the time, mostly made up of volunteers, had limited firefighting capability, and Toronto Fire Department was not formed until 1875. Fire hydrants and water tanks or barrels had been added in 1842 by the Metropolitan Water Company, but they were not enough.

Aftermath

None of the buildings within the Market Block (10–15 acres of property) survived, but buildings surrounding the block, such as the Daniel Brooke Building at King and Nelson, were spared. The Toronto City Hall had already been located one block south to Front Street in 1845. Most businesses were rebuilt by the fall of 1849.

Most of the buildings that burned down were made of wood, so in response, the city changed building codes to prevent future losses of this magnitude. St Lawrence Market (1851) was rebuilt and new buildings like St. Lawrence Hall (1851) and the Cathedral Church of St. James (1853) were built to code. This did not mean an end to future fires, as the year 1904 proved in the city's new core. Today, most of the block north of King Street is St. James Park.

See also
 Great Fire of Toronto (1904)

References
 
 
 
 
Notes

External links
 City of Toronto Archives: Toronto history FAQs

History of Toronto
1849 in Canada
Disasters in Ontario
1849 fires in North America
Urban fires in Canada
19th century in Toronto
1849 disasters in Canada